The Embassy is a professional wrestling stable in All Elite Wrestling (AEW) and its sister promotion Ring of Honor (ROH), where they are the current ROH World Six-Man Tag Team Championship.

History

Ring of Honor
The Embassy is led by Prince Nana, a real-life Ashanti prince, who has taken his real-life status as a prince of a nation as a part of his heel manager gimmick. In storylines, Nana used his wealth gained from the taxes of people of Ghana to hire wrestlers to wrestle the Embassy's opponents and rivals, although he did once use winnings from betting on Ghana in a match (against the United States) in the 2006 FIFA World Cup to hire one.

In 2004 Nana formed The Embassy in Ring of Honor, Nana used his wealth gained from the taxes of people of Ghana to hire wrestlers to wrestle his opponents and rivals. Under his management John Walters defended his ROH Pure Championship and Jimmy Rave, Alex Shelley and Abyss won the Trios Tournament in 2006.

On July 23, 2022, at Death Before Dishonor, Prince Nana announced he had purchased Tully Blanchard Enterprises and reformed The Embassy with Brian Cage, Kaun, Toa Liona & Jonathan Gresham. They would go on to defeat the team of Alex Zayne, Blake Christian & Tony Deppen during the preshow. Jonathan Gresham was removed from the group after losing the ROH World Championship and requesting his release.

On December 10, at Final Battle, The Embassy defeated Dalton Castle & The Boys to become the ROH World Six-Man Tag Team Champions.

All Elite Wrestling
On the October 14, 2022, episode of AEW Rampage, The Embassy made their AEW debut as a team losing to FTR and Shawn Spears.

On the November 1, 2022, episode of AEW Dark, The Embassy defeated the team of Fuego Del Sol along with Waves And Curls (Jaylen Brandyn & Traevon Jordan).

On the December 5, episode of AEW Dark: Elevation, The Embassy defeated Dan Adams, Facade & Star Rider.

Members

Current

Former

Part-time

Sub-groups

Current

Championships and accomplishments
Ring of Honor
ROH World Championship (1 time) – Jonathan Gresham
ROH Pure Championship (1 time) – John Walters
ROH World Six-Man Tag Team Championship (1 time, current) – Brian Cage, Kaun & Toa Liona
Trios Tournament winner (2006) – Jimmy Rave, Alex Shelley & Abyss

References

Independent promotions teams and stables
Ring of Honor teams and stables
All Elite Wrestling teams and stables